Luigi Luciani (born 30 January 1996) is an Italian football player. He plays for Fenegrò Calcio.

Club career
He made his Serie C debut for Venezia on 24 September 2016 in a game against Lumezzane.

On 11 September 2018, he joined Serie D club OltrepòVoghera. In the summer 2019, he joined A.C.D. Nardò. He played one game for the club in the Coppa Italia Serie D, before he left the club again to join Fenegrò Calcio only one month after his arrival.

References

External links
 

1996 births
People from San Severo
Living people
Italian footballers
Italy youth international footballers
Venezia F.C. players
S.S. Arezzo players
Santarcangelo Calcio players
U.S. Gavorrano players
Serie D players
Serie C players
Association football defenders
Footballers from Apulia
Sportspeople from the Province of Foggia